Nagehana is a genus of moths in the family Oecophoridae.

Species
Nagehana chagualphaga (Beéche, 2003)
Nagehana elquiensis (Beéche, 2003)
Nagehana rustica (Clarke, 1978)

References

Oecophorinae
Moth genera